Players and pairs who neither have high enough rankings nor receive wild cards may participate in a qualifying tournament held one week before the annual Wimbledon Tennis Championships.

Seeds

  Dick Norman (second round)
  Olivier Delaître (second round)
  Stéphane Simian (second round)
  Gastón Etlis (second round)
  Eyal Ran (second round)
  Steve Bryan (qualifying competition, lucky loser)
  Andrei Olhovskiy (second round)
  Nicolás Pereira (qualifying competition, lucky loser)
  Steve Campbell (second round)
  Stéphane Huet (qualifying competition, lucky loser)
  Mark Knowles (first round)
  Jeff Salzenstein (qualified)
  Martín Rodríguez (first round)
  Michael Joyce (second round)
  Petr Luxa (second round)
  Guillermo Cañas (second round)
  Cecil Mamiit (first round)
  Kevin Ullyett (second round)
  Nicolas Escudé (second round)
  Frédéric Fontang (second round)
  Gianluca Pozzi (second round)
  Ben Ellwood (qualifying competition, lucky loser)
  Luis Herrera (qualified)
  Oren Motevassel (qualifying competition)
  Arne Thoms (first round)
  Ionuț Moldovan (second round)
  Ivo Heuberger (second round)
  Ramón Delgado (second round)
  David Nainkin (qualifying competition)
  Rainer Schüttler (first round)
  Brian MacPhie (second round)
  Eyal Erlich (qualifying competition)

Qualifiers

  Michael Tebbutt
  Hendrik Jan Davids
  Christophe Van Garsse
  Sergi Durán
  David Rikl
  Wade McGuire
  Todd Larkham
  Patrick Baur
  Pat Cash
  Luis Herrera
  Rodolphe Gilbert
  Jeff Salzenstein
  Óscar Burrieza
  Mahesh Bhupathi
  Arnaud Clément
  John van Lottum

Lucky losers

  Steve Bryan
  Nicolás Pereira
  Stéphane Huet
  Ben Ellwood

Qualifying draw

First qualifier

Second qualifier

Third qualifier

Fourth qualifier

Fifth qualifier

Sixth qualifier

Seventh qualifier

Eighth qualifier

Ninth qualifier

Tenth qualifier

Eleventh qualifier

Twelfth qualifier

Thirteenth qualifier

Fourteen qualifier

Fifteenth qualifier

Sixteenth qualifier

External links

 1997 Wimbledon Championships – Men's draws and results at the International Tennis Federation

Men's Singles Qualifying
Wimbledon Championship by year – Men's singles qualifying